This is a list of ethnic groups in Chad.

Ethnic groups 
Arabs
Baggara
Fula
Buduma
Maba
Hausa
Fur
Haddad
Kanembu
Kanuri
Borno
Kim
Lisi
Bilala
Kuka
Medogo
Masalit
Sara
Toubou
Tupuri
Moussei
Masa
 Hadjerai.
 Kotoko.
Peuvu 

(Indented entries in the list are subdivisions of the main entry above them.)

See also
Ethnic groups in Chad
Demographics of Chad

References

Ethnic group

Chad